Sam Harding may refer to:

 Sam Harding (rugby union) (born 1980), New Zealand rugby union footballer
 Sam Harding (athlete) (born 1991), Australian Paralympic athlete